Altagonum flavicorne is a species of ground beetle in the subfamily Carabinae. It was described by Louwerens in 1969.

References

flavicorne
Beetles described in 1969